Enterocin and its derivatives are bacteriocins synthesized by the lactic acid bacteria, Enterococcus. This class of polyketide antibiotics are effective against foodborne pathogens including L. monocytogenes, Listeria, and Bacillus. Due to its proteolytic degradability in the gastrointestinal tract, enterocin is used for controlling foodborne pathogens via human consumption.

History 
Enterocin was discovered from soil and marine Streptomyces strains as well as from marine ascidians of Didemnum and it has also been found in a mangrove strains Streptomyces qinglanensis and Salinispora pacifica.

Total synthesis 
The total synthesis of enterocin has been reported.

Biosynthesis 
Enterocin has a caged, tricyclic, nonaromatic core and its formation undergoes a flavoenzyme (EncM) catalyzed Favorskii-like rearrangement of a poly(beta-carbonyl). Studies done on enterocin have shown that it is biosynthesized from a type II polyketide synthase (PKS) pathway, starting with a structure derived from phenylalanine or activation of benzoic acid followed by the EncM catalyzed rearrangement.

The enzyme EncN catalyzes the ATP-dependent transfer of the benzoate to EncC, the acyl carrier protein. EncC transfers the aromatic unit to EncA-EncB, the ketosynthase in order for malonation via FabD, the malonyl-CoA:ACP transacylase. A Claisen condensation occurs between the benzoyl and malonyl groups and occurs six more times followed by reaction with EncD, a ketoreductase; the intermediate undergoes the EncM catalyzed oxidative rearrangement to form the enterocin tricyclic core. Further reaction with O-methyltransferase, EncK and cytochrome P450 hydroxylase, EncR yields enterocin.

References 

Antibiotics
Oxygen heterocycles
Lactones
Heterocyclic compounds with 3 rings
Methoxy compounds